Myles Poholke (born 10 July 1998) is a former professional Australian rules footballer last playing for the Adelaide Football Club in the Australian Football League (AFL). He was drafted by Adelaide with their second selection and 44th overall in the 2016 national draft. He made his debut in the 10-point victory against  at the Sydney Cricket Ground (SCG) in round five of the 2018 season.

Statistics
 Statistics are correct to the end of 2020

|- style="background-color: #EAEAEA"
! scope="row" style="text-align:center" | 2017
|
| 31 || 0 || — || — || — || — || — || — || — || — || — || — || — || — || — || —
|-
! scope="row" style="text-align:center" | 2018
|
| 10 || 9 || 3 || 4 || 57 || 35 || 92 || 38 || 18 || 0.3 || 0.4 || 6.3 || 3.9 || 10.2 || 4.2 || 2.0
|- style="background-color: #EAEAEA"
! scope="row" style="text-align:center" | 2019
|
| 10 || 2 || — || 1 || 10 || 15 || 25 || 7 || 5 || — || 0.5 || 5.0 || 7.5 || 12.5 || 3.5 || 2.5
|-
! scope="row" style="text-align:center" | 2020
|
| 10 || 5 || 2 || 1 || 29 || 23 || 52 || 15 || 12 || 0.4 || 0.2 || 5.8 || 4.6 || 10.4 || 3.0 || 2.4
|- class="sortbottom"
! colspan=3| Career
! 16
! 5
! 6
! 96
! 73
! 169
! 60
! 35
! 0.3
! 0.4
! 6.0
! 4.6
! 10.6
! 3.8
! 2.2
|}

References

External links

 

1998 births
Living people
Adelaide Football Club players
Adelaide Football Club (SANFL) players
Dandenong Stingrays players
Australian rules footballers from Victoria (Australia)